The Corps of French Female Volunteers (or CVF) was a military auxiliary service established by the Free French forces in the United Kingdom during World War II. It was founded on 7 November 1940 as the Female Corps (CF) and was inspired by the precedent of the Auxiliary Territorial Service (ATS) and was the first female unit in the military history of France. It was initially commanded by Simonne Mathieu and later by Hélène Terré. Initially only 26-strong, the CF was intended to provide personnel to serve in clerical and secretarial functions that would enable male personnel to be dispatched to front-line units. The CF was renamed on 16 November 1941 and formally integrated into the Free French Forces. It numbered 430 women by July 1943. It was disbanded in May 1944 at the start of the Liberation of France and was superseded by the Arme féminine the following month.

Notable personnel
Simonne Mathieu (1908-1980), tennis player and first commanding officer
Hélène Terré (1903-1993), second commanding officer
Tereska Torrès (1920-2012), author of the fictionalised memoir Women's Barracks (1950).
Éliane Brault (1895-1982), politician and freemason.

References

Bibliography

Further reading

Free French Forces
Military units and formations established in 1940
Military units and formations disestablished in 1944
1940 establishments in the United Kingdom
1944 disestablishments in the United Kingdom
All-female military units and formations
French women in World War II